Rebekka Habermas (born 3 July 1959, in Frankfurt am Main) is a German historian, professor of modern history at the University of Göttingen, in Germany. Habermas has made substantial contributions to German social and cultural history of the 19th century.

Life 
Rebekka Habermas is the daughter of the philosopher and sociologist Jürgen Habermas. From 1979 to 1985, she studied history and Romance studies in Konstanz and Paris, which she completed a master's degree and Staatsexamen in 1985. She then received training in publishing and worked as editor, for a time, at S. Fischer Verlag. Having earned her doctorate at Saarland University, in 1990, under the auspices of the German National Academic Foundation, Habermas spent the next two years as associate professor at the same university's historical institute. From 1992–97, Habermas conducted research in the context of the University of Bielefeld's Special Research Project "Sozialgeschichte des neuzeitlichen Bürgertums," which was financed through the Deutsche Forschungsgemeinschaft. In 1998, Habermas secured her habilitation from the faculty of history and philosophy at the University of Bielefeld and then acted, for two years, as interim full professor (Lehrstuhlvertretung) at Ruhr University Bochum. Since 2000, she has held a chair in medieval and modern history at the University of Göttingen.

Academic honors and awards 
Habermas has held a number of visiting appointments:
 Guest Professor at the École des Hautes Études en Sciences Sociales in Paris (2002);
 Richard von Weizsäcker Fellow at St Antony's College of Oxford University, supported by the Volkswagen Foundation (2013–2014);
 Visiting Fellow at the University of Münster's excellence cluster "Religion und Politik" (2014);
 Fellow at the Lichtenberg-Kolleg, Göttingen's Institute for Advanced Study in the Humanities & Social Sciences (2014–15);
 Guest Professor at the Université de Montréal (spring semester, 2016);
 Theodor Heuss Professor at The New School (autumn term, 2016).

Since 2010, Habermas has served as spokesperson for the research training group (Graduiertenkolleg) "Dynamiken von Raum und Geschlecht," funded by the Deutsche Forschungsgemeinschaft. 2011 then saw her reception of Geisteswissenschaften International, a prize awarded by the Börsenverein des Deutschen Buchhandels to support translation of distinguished academic books. In 2012, she was inducted into the Academia Europaea. Two years later, she received honorable mention for the Chester Penn Higby Prize, an award bestowed biennially by the Journal of Modern History for the best essay published in the organ.

Professional activities 
Habermas serves as editor of the journal Historische Anthropologie and co-editor of the series Campus Historische Studien. In addition, she is a member of numerous research groups (e.g., Historische Anthropologie, Geschlechterdifferenz in europäischen Rechtskulturen, as well as the University of Göttingen's own Geschlechterforschung), a board member of Göttingen's Zentrum für Theorie und Methodik der Kulturwissenschaften, and a contributor to the conception and planning of Wolfgang Benz's series Europäische Geschichte. She sits on any number of other commissions and juries as well, including the European Research Council's scientific review panel for social sciences and humanities.

Areas of expertise 
Habermas's work focuses on the history of the bourgeoisie, legal history, administration history, and gender history, the history of criminality, the book, and religion, as well as historical anthropology.

Select bibliography

References

External links 
 German National Library Catalogue
 Homepage of Rebekka Habermas at the University of Göttingen
 Homepage of Rebekka Habermas at the Academy of Europe

1959 births
Living people
German women historians
Academic staff of the University of Göttingen
20th-century German historians
21st-century German historians
Jürgen Habermas